North Carolina's 20th House district is one of 120 districts in the North Carolina House of Representatives. It has been represented by Republican Ted Davis Jr. since 2021.

Geography
Since 2013, the district has included part of New Hanover County. The district overlaps with the 7th Senate district.

District officeholders since 1983

Election results

2022

2020

2018

2016

2014

2012

2010

2008

2006

2004

2002

2000

References

North Carolina House districts
New Hanover County, North Carolina